The 2012–13 AL-Bank Ligaen season was the 56th season of ice hockey in Denmark. Nine teams participated in the league, and SønderjyskE Ishockey won the championship.

Regular season

Playoffs

External links
 AL-Bank Ligaen official website

Dan
2012 in Danish sport
2013 in Danish sport